Tietê may refer to:

 Tietê, São Paulo, a city in the state of São Paulo, Brazil 
 Tietê River, a river in the state of São Paulo, Brazil 
 Tietê Bus Terminal (Portuguese: Terminal Rodoviário Tietê), a bus station in the city of São Paulo, SP, Brazil